The House of Kurakin is a name of an old, historical Russian princely family descended from Lithuanian dynasty of Gediminas and it's also a masculine surname. Its feminine counterpart is Kurakina.

Notable members 
Prince Alexander Kurakin (1752–1818), Russian statesman and diplomat
Prince Alexey Kurakin (1759–1829), Russian statesman
Antons Kurakins (born 1990), Latvian football defender
Prince Boris Kurakin (1676–1727), Russian statesman and diplomat
Boris Alekseevich Kurakin (1784–1850), Russian politician and diplomat
Dmitri Kurakin (born 1975), Estonian ice dancer
Juri Kurakin (born 1987), Estonian ice dancer, brother of Dmitri Kurakin
Igor Kurakin (born 1963), Russian football player
Princess Natalia Ivanovna Kurakina (1766-1831), Russian composer, singer and noblewoman

Russian-language surnames